The London Borough of Barking and Dagenham consists of two parliamentary constituencies: Barking; and the new constituency of Dagenham and Rainham. The borough is within the City and East London Assembly constituency, returning Unmesh Desai AM as the directly elected assembly member. Barking and Dagenham was part of the London constituency in the European Parliament.

The council has a mayor, who is elected at the council annual general meeting by councillors. The mayor must be a serving councillor, although the role of mayor is non-political. The mayor chairs council meetings and performs ceremonial duties in the borough.

Following the Barking and Dagenham Council election as part of the London local elections, which coincided with the 2010 general election, the Labour Party won all 51 seats. The party repeated this feat at the subsequent local elections in 2014 and 2018, with every ward represented entirely by Labour councillors.

History

The borough was formed in 1965 by the London Government Act 1963 as the London Borough of Barking. The constituent parts were the greater part of the Municipal Borough of Barking and the entire Municipal Borough of Dagenham, the former area of which was transferred to Greater London from Essex. At the time of the amalgamation, the combined population of Barking and Dagenham was around 180,000, the northern tip of Dagenham having been incorporated into Redbridge and a small area of Barking in Newham.

The borough was renamed Barking and Dagenham in 1980.

The composition of the council at each local election is shown in the table below.

Wards
51 councillors form Barking and Dagenham London Borough Council. They are elected from the 17 wards which make up the borough. The wards are:

References